Johann Jakob Dorner the Elder (1741–1813), who was born at Ehrenstetten, near Freiburg in Breisgau, was a painter of historical and genre subjects. He was at first a pupil of Rösch at Freiburg and of Ignaz Bauer at Augsburg. He afterwards visited Italy, the Netherlands, and Paris. He was a professor and director of the Gallery at Munich in 1770, and died in that city in 1813. In the Darmstadt Gallery is a picture of Two Soldiers and a Maiden by him; and in the Pinakothek at Munich, a Linen Draper, which is a portrait of his wife, dated 1775.

The amateur Amalia von Schattenhofer was a pupil of Dorner. His son also became a painter.

See also
 List of German painters

References

 

18th-century German painters
18th-century German male artists
German male painters
19th-century German painters
19th-century German male artists
1741 births
1813 deaths
Artists from Freiburg im Breisgau